Dalneye is a rural locality (a selo) in Budarinsky Selsoviet, Limansky District, Astrakhan Oblast, Russia. The population was 78 as of 2010. There is 1 street.

Geography 
Dalneye is located 24 km southeast of Liman (the district's administrative centre) by road. Budarino is the nearest rural locality.

References 

Rural localities in Limansky District